Baby Island Heights is a small unincorporated community in Island County, Washington, United States. It is named after a small island offshore of the community commonly known as Baby Island.  Most of the community is medium- to high-bank waterfront as it stretches along the shoreline of the Saratoga Passage.

History 

Before the community of Baby Island Heights was platted, the waterfront along the community was a well-known fishing hotspot for salmon.  This attracted several well-known early-20th-century Seattle businessmen to the area, including Virgil Bogue, Eddie Bauer, and Thomas Moore, all of whom built cabins in the present-day community. In 1924 the Baby Island (fishing) Resort opened and attracted people to the community for more than 30 years.  During the summer of 1936 the Civil Service Corps hacked a road through the forest to the community greatly improving automobile access to Langley, WA.  It wasn't until 1946, when public electricity was finally brought into the area, that growth started to take place.  Many of the present-day homes in the community were built between the late 1940s and the early 1970s.
http://www.oldcamano.net/babyisland.html

Present day 

Baby Island Heights is currently home to about 200 residents, almost half of which are seasonal.  Most of the communities homes are fairly old, but many new homes have been constructed during the last decade.  Community access to the waterfront is provided to residents by the Baby Island Beach Club, a not for profit corporation.  Potable water hookups are limited and provided by the community owned Baby Island Heights Water Corporation, a not for profit corporation.  All homes in the community are served by private septic systems. Access to the community is provided by Saratoga Road to the east and East Harbor Road to the south.

References

Unincorporated communities in Island County, Washington
Unincorporated communities in Washington (state)